Oliver Eric Rowland (born 10 August 1992) is a British racing driver. He is currently competing full-time in Formula E driving for Mahindra Racing. He has previously competed for Manor Motorsport in the 2018 WEC season, and he was also previously the young driver of Williams F1 Team during the 2018 Formula 1 season.

Career

Karting

Born in Barnsley, Rowland began karting at the age of seven, and spent a successful decade racing in the various classes around the United Kingdom. After finishing second in the Super 1 National Cadet Championship in 2002, Rowland won the championship for the next two years. In 2005, Rowland moved into the JICA class series, and again finished as a championship runner-up, finishing just two points behind Will Stevens. Rowland also narrowly missed out on the title in 2006, finishing one point behind champion Jack Harvey, and was also second in the Monaco Kart Cup driving for Zip Kart, behind Millennium Motorsport's Scott Jenkins. He also finished 20th in the European Championship for the class.
After his two previous runner-up campaigns, Rowland took the Super 1 JICA title in 2007, 30 points clear of nearest rival Tom Joyner. Joyner did however take the British Open Championship, where Rowland finished in third position. In the continental races, Rowland could only finish 25th in Monaco, and 37th in the European Championship. Rowland moved up to the KF2 class in 2008, and became a member of the Tony Kart Racing Team. Rowland won the CIK-FIA World Cup event in, and also placed third in the WSK International Series and fifth in the European Championship. He also competed in the KF1 Asia-Pacific series, where he finished eleventh.

In 2009, Rowland competed for most of the season in Super KF, competing for Chiesa Corse. He finished sixth in the European Championship, ninth in the World Cup, and twelfth in the World Championship; his best result came at the South Garda Winter Cup, where he finished in fourth position. Rowland remained in Super KF in 2010, where he won his second World Cup crown, and also finished 16th in the KZ1 version of the series.

Formula Renault

Rowland left karting and stepped into Formula Renault, contesting the 2010 Formula Renault UK Winter Series with CRS Racing. He also received sponsorship from the Racing Steps Foundation, which funded his graduation into car racing. He took two twelfth-place finishes in his first car racing meeting at Snetterton, but eventually took his first win in the final race of the championship, at Pembrey. The victory helped to move up into seventh place in the championship standings, finishing tied on points with Luke Wright but ahead on countback.

Rowland moved to Fortec Motorsport for a full British championship campaign in 2011. Rowland took his first podium of the season, with third place at Donington Park, starting a run of four consecutive podiums – all third places – before a run of just two podium finishes in seven races. Rowland's last seven races were his best in the championship, taking four wins, four fastest laps, three pole positions and three second places. As a result of the strong run, Rowland became the winner of the Graduate Cup for young drivers, and finished as runner-up to teammate Alex Lynn in the main championship; the runner-up position was only sealed on the final lap of the final race, setting the quickest lap to score two bonus points in order to move him into a tie on points with Tio Ellinas, but with four wins to Ellinas' two, he placed ahead on countback. He also contested the Formula Renault UK Finals Series with the team, and comfortably won the championship with four race wins from six races. Rowland was nominated for the McLaren Autosport BRDC Award due to his performances in the main series. On 4 December 2011, after the evaluation tests held at Silverstone, Rowland was named as the winner of the award, taking the £100,000 cash prize and a Formula One test with McLaren.
He led the Eurocup Formula Renault 2.0 Championship after taking his third victory of the 2013 season at the Red Bull Ring, eventually finishing the season second in the standings.

He was part of the McLaren young driver programme in 2007–2010

Formula Renault 3.5
Rowland signed a contract with Fortec Motorsport in July 2013 to race the Formula Renault 3.5 Series in the 2014 season. He finished fourth overall with two wins and seven podiums.

Rowland continued with Fortec Motorsport in the 2015 Formula Renault 3.5. He won eight races out of 17, becoming champion in the penultimate round.

Rowland won a test with Red Bull F1 at Silverstone for leading the series in 2015.

Formula E

Mahindra 
Rowland competed in the 2015 Punta del Este ePrix with Mahindra Racing, in place of Nick Heidfeld, who had to undergo surgery for ligament damaged that he sustained during the Putrajaya ePrix. Rowland started the race 16th on the grid, and managed to finish in 13th place. He did not race again in Formula E for the rest of the season, but he served as a studio pundit for the television broadcast at some of the remaining races.

Nissan e.dams 

During the 2016-17 season, Rowland was hired by Renault e.Dams as a standby replacement for Sébastien Buemi for the 2017 Mexico City ePrix.

In November 2018, Rowland joined the championship full-time with the newly re-branded Nissan e.Dams following the departure of Alexander Albon to Toro Rosso. He claimed his first pole in Formula E in Sanya ePrix and finished in second place in the race, which was his first podium in Formula E. He took his first Formula E win at the 2020 Berlin ePrix, leading every lap after starting on pole position.

Return to Mahindra 
Rowland moved to Mahindra for the 2021–22 Formula E season. He took his first points finish for the team at the 2022 Diriyah ePrix. Rowland retired from the inaugural Jakarta ePrix after losing one of this tyres on the second lap.

GP2 Series
In 2015, Rowland made his GP2 debut at Silverstone with MP Motorsport. He finished in the points in both races. He contested in three other rounds with MP and Status Grand Prix.

In February 2016, it was announced that Rowland would compete in the series full-time with MP, with whom he finished ninth.

For the 2017 season, Rowland switched to the DAMS squad, finishing third in the championship.

Formula One
In February 2016, Rowland was confirmed as a member of Renault's young driver program, and in April 2017 Rowland was signed to the role of development driver to the Renault F1 Team.

In February 2018 Rowland was confirmed as Williams Martini Racing's official Junior Driver.

Racing record

Career summary

* Season still in progress.

Complete Formula Renault 2.0 UK Championship results 
(key) (Races in bold indicate pole position) (Races in italics indicate fastest lap)

Complete Eurocup Formula Renault 2.0 results 
(key) (Races in bold indicate pole position) (Races in italics indicate fastest lap)

Complete Formula Renault 3.5 Series results
(key) (Races in bold indicate pole position) (Races in italics indicate fastest lap)

Complete GP2 Series results
(key) (Races in bold indicate pole position) (Races in italics indicate fastest lap)

† Did not finish, but was classified as he had completed more than 90% of the race distance.

Complete Formula E results
(key) (Races in bold indicate pole position; races in italics indicate fastest lap)

† Did not finish, but was classified as he had completed more than 90% of the race distance.

Complete FIA Formula 2 Championship results
(key) (Races in bold indicate pole position) (Races in italics indicate fastest lap)

Complete FIA World Endurance Championship results
(key) (Races in bold indicate pole position; races in italics indicate fastest lap)

24 Hours of Le Mans Results

References

External links
 
 
 British Racing Drivers' Club profile

1992 births
Living people
Sportspeople from Sheffield
Racing drivers from Yorkshire
English racing drivers
Karting World Championship drivers
British Formula Renault 2.0 drivers
Formula Renault Eurocup drivers
World Series Formula V8 3.5 drivers
GP2 Series drivers
Formula E drivers
FIA Formula 2 Championship drivers
24 Hours of Le Mans drivers
Fortec Motorsport drivers
Manor Motorsport drivers
MP Motorsport drivers
Status Grand Prix drivers
Mahindra Racing drivers
DAMS drivers
Strakka Racing drivers
FIA World Endurance Championship drivers
CRS Racing drivers
Nismo drivers
Mercedes-AMG Motorsport drivers